Andrés Rafael Feliz Sarita (born July 7, 1997) is a Dominican basketball player who currently plays for the Club Joventut Badalona of the Spanish Liga ACB. He played college basketball for the Northwest Florida State Raiders and the Illinois Fighting Illini. He has represented the Dominican Republic in FIBA-sanctioned international youth and senior level competitions and was the top scorer at the 2015 FIBA Under-19 World Championship.

Early life
Feliz grew up in Guachupita, one of the poorest and most dangerous areas of Santo Domingo in the Dominican Republic. His neighborhood received limited access to water and electricity. Because his family could not afford basketball shoes, he played in his school shoes or borrowed them from a friend.

High school career
While at West Oaks Academy in Orlando, Florida Feliz helped lead his varsity basketball team to consecutive Sunshine Independent Athletic Association state titles and was a two-time tournament MVP. During his junior season, he was teammates with Corey Sanders. As a high school senior, Feliz was named to the World Team in the 2016 Nike Hoop Summit that took place at the Moda Center in Portland, Oregon.

During the summer of 2015, Feliz verbally committed to play for then head coach Orlando Antigua and the South Florida Bulls. He received interest from Louisville, Miami, and Missouri during his recruitment.

College career
As a freshman at the University of South Florida, Feliz left school a few days into the semester and immediately enrolled at Northwest Florida State College in Niceville, Florida. As a freshman at Northwest Florida, Feliz averaged 11.6 points per game, 4.7 assists per game, and 3.2 rebounds per game while averaging 57.3 percent from the field. As a sophomore, Feliz led Northwest Florida to a Florida State Title an elite eight appearance in the NJCAA Men's Division I Basketball Championship while averaging 20.0 points, 6.1 assists, 5.7 rebounds and 2.1 steals per game and becoming Northwest Florida State's all-time assists leader. Feliz was named a NJCAA DI First Team All-American and to the 2018 NJCAA DI All-Tournament Team. As the top rated junior college point guard in the United States, Feliz committed to continue his college career playing for head coach Brad Underwood, his former coach Orlando Antigua, and the Illinois Fighting Illini.

As a junior, Feliz was a spark plug coming off the bench, averaging 8.3 points, 2.2 assist, and 2.9 rebounds per game and shot 45-percent from the field and 27-percent from three-point range. He averaged 11 points, 5 rebounds, and 2.9 assists per game as a senior.

Professional career
On February 12, 2021, he has signed with CB Prat of the LEB Oro.

On July 13, 2021, he has signed with Club Joventut Badalona of the Liga ACB.

The Basketball Tournament
Feliz joined House of 'Paign, a team composed primarily of Illinois alumni in The Basketball Tournament 2020. He scored 20 points and had seven rebounds in a 76–53 win over War Tampa in the first round.

National team career
Feliz made his international debut for the Dominican Republic national basketball team during the 2013 Centrobasket U17 Championship for Men. In 2014, he won a bronze medal playing for the Dominican Republic national team in the 2014 FIBA Americas Under-18 Championship. In 2015, Feliz was the leading scorer in the 2015 FIBA Under-19 World Championship, averaging 18.9 points and 3.7 assists in seven games. He also played for the Dominican Republic national team during the 2015 Pan American Games.

Career statistics

College

NCAA Division I

|-
| style="text-align:left;"| 2018–19
| style="text-align:left;"| Illinois
| 33 || 5 || 22.3 || .453 || .270 || .755 || 2.9 || 2.2 || 1.0 || .0 || 8.3
|-
| style="text-align:left;"| 2019–20
| style="text-align:left;"| Illinois
| 31 || 15 || 26.8 || .460 || .274 || .769 || 5.0 || 2.9 || .7 || .0 || 11.0
|- class="sortbottom"
| style="text-align:center;" colspan="2"| Career
| 64 || 20 || 24.5 || .457 || .273 || .763 || 3.9 || 2.6 || .9 || .0 || 9.6

JUCO

|-
| style="text-align:left;"| 2016–17
| style="text-align:left;"| Northwest Florida State
| 28 || 28 || 25.0 || .573 || .184 || .702 || 3.2 || 4.7 || 1.5 || .0 || 11.6
|-
| style="text-align:left;"| 2017–18
| style="text-align:left;"| Northwest Florida State
| 34 || 33 || 31.0 || .611 || .418 || .772 || 5.7 || 6.1 || 2.1 || .1 || 20.0
|- class="sortbottom"
| style="text-align:center;" colspan="2"| Career
| 62 || 61 || 28.3 || .597 || .349 || .750 || 4.6 || 5.5 || 1.8 || .1 || 16.2

References

External links
Illinois Fighting Illini bio
Northwest Florida State Raiders bio

1997 births
Living people
Basketball players at the 2015 Pan American Games
Basketball players from Orlando, Florida
CB Prat players
Dominican Republic expatriate basketball people in Spain
Dominican Republic expatriate basketball people in the United States
Dominican Republic men's basketball players
Illinois Fighting Illini men's basketball players
Joventut Badalona players
Liga ACB players
Northwest Florida State Raiders men's basketball players
Pan American Games competitors for the Dominican Republic
Shooting guards